Chair of Cabinet is a position in the Executive Council (cabinet) of the province of Ontario. The current Chair of Cabinet is Vic Fedeli. It is a ministerial position without portfolio, although occupants typically have concurrent appointment to another cabinet position.

List of ministers
Claude Bennett 1985—1986
Dwight Duncan 2003–2007
Kathleen Wynne 2007–2008
Gerry Phillips 2008–2011
Rick Bartolucci 2011–2013
Linda Jeffrey 2013–2014
John Gerretsen 2014
Jim Bradley 2014–2016
Deb Matthews 2016–2018
Helena Jaczek 2018–2018
Vic Fedeli 2018–present

See also
 Premier (Canada)
 List of Ontario premiers
 Executive Council of Ontario

Members of the Executive Council of Ontario
Ministers without portfolio